Aaron Loves Angela is a 1975 American comedy-drama film written by Gerald Sanford and directed by Gordon Parks Jr. It stars Moses Gunn, Kevin Hooks and Irene Cara.

Plot
A modern adaptation of William Shakespeare's Romeo and Juliet, the film deals with the struggles of living in Harlem and intercultural divides in the 1970s. Two teenagers living in the slums of New York City are deeply in love with each other. Angela is a Puerto Rican girl who lives in Spanish Harlem with her mother. She falls in love with Aaron, a young Black basketball player. Their intercultural relationship is not approved by either of their parents, and they soon find out that the same prejudice is shared by their friends and neighbors. They rebel by meeting in secret, yet soon find themselves in danger.

Cast

Soundtrack

The soundtrack, composed by José Feliciano and Janna Marlyn Feliciano, was released as the José Feliciano album Angela for Private Stock Records. Forty years after being recorded, in 2016, the soundtrack was re-released for the first time for digital stores.

Track listing

Notes
Not included on the album but in the movie were: "What I Wanna Do" (performed by José Feliciano) and "Wilfull Strut". Both these songs were used as B-sides of the single, "Angela" in different territories.

 In Latin countries, the single "Angela" included the same song sung in Spanish on the B-side, same version in Spanish was also part of the LP in those Latin countries like first song of b-side

See also
 List of American films of 1975

External links
 
 

1975 films
1970s coming-of-age drama films
1975 romantic drama films
American coming-of-age drama films
American romantic drama films
American teen romance films
Blaxploitation films
Columbia Pictures films
1970s English-language films
Films about interracial romance
Films based on Romeo and Juliet
Films directed by Gordon Parks Jr.
Films set in New York City
Films shot in New York City
1970s American films